Ultiminio Ramos Zaqueira (2 December 1941 – 3 September 2017) was a Cuban-born Mexican professional boxer who was better known as Sugar Ramos. Ramos fought out of Mexico where he was adopted as a national hero. He was a world featherweight champion and member of the International Boxing Hall of Fame.

Exile 
Ramos won the Cuban featherweight championship belt in 1960 and defected to Mexico City when Fidel Castro came into power.

Famous bouts 
In Mexico, Ultiminio "Sugar" Ramos built his historical career. On 21 March 1963, Ramos had a bout scheduled at Dodger Stadium. On that day, Ramos severely beat Davey Moore. In the 10th round, Moore was knocked out. Four days later, Moore died from injuries sustained to his brain stem.

This was similar to Ramos' twelfth professional fight in which José Blanco died from injuries sustained in the fight.

Retirement and death 
Ramos lost his titles in 1964 to
Vicente Saldivar after the fight was stopped in the twelfth round due to cuts. Ramos then moved up to lightweight, eventually earning a shot at then champion Carlos Ortiz in 1966. Ramos would lose the fight via fifth-round TKO, and then an immediate rematch by TKO in the fourth round. He continued boxing until 1972. Sugar Ramos died at the age of 75 on 3 September 2017 in his adopted home of Mexico City due to complications from cancer. He was survived by his four children.

Professional boxing record

See also 
 Lineal championship
 List of WBA world champions
 List of WBC world champions
 List of Mexican boxing world champions

References 

 IBHOF Bio

External links 
 
 https://www.wbaboxing.com/wba-history/world-boxing-association-history
 https://boxrec.com/media/index.php/National_Boxing_Association%27s_Quarterly_Ratings:_1963

|-

|-

|-

|-

1941 births
2017 deaths
Cuban male boxers
Mexican male boxers
Cuban emigrants to Mexico
World boxing champions
International Boxing Hall of Fame inductees
World featherweight boxing champions
Sportspeople from Matanzas